Neobola nilotica is a species of ray-finned fish in the family Cyprinidae.
It is found in the White Nile River in Sudan. It can reach a maximum length of 2.0 cm.

References

Neobola
Fish of Sudan
Taxa named by Franz Werner
Fish described in 1919